CCSG may refer to:

Corpus Christianorum Series Graeca
Coiste Cearta Síbialta na Gaeilge
Collège catholique Samuel-Genest
Council of Commonwealth Student Governments at Pennsylvania State University